PROSER1 is a protein that in humans is encoded by the PROSER1 gene.

Nomenclature
PROSER1 has several aliases: C13orf23, KIAA2032,  and proline and serine-rich protein 1.

Gene

Location
PROSER1 is located on the negative (reverse) strand of chromosome 13 at position 13q13.3. It spans from 39,009,865 base pairs from the pter to 39,038,095 bp from the pter, with a size of 28,231 bases. PROSER1 has a total of 13 exons in its primary unspliced transcript mRNA of 5,185 bp. There are 2 isoforms of PROSER1, both within the 5,000 bp range.

Gene neighborhood
Genes STOML3 and NHLRC3 neighbor PROSER1 on chromosome 13.

Tissue distribution

Expressed Sequence Tag mapping of PROSER1 expression shows that it has particularly high expression in lymph, embryonic tissue, thymus, and uterus sites. It has moderate expression in testis, larynx, nerve, blood, and adipose tissue sites.
According to the Human Protein Atlas, PROSER1 has general cytoplasmic expression and is expressed in all RNA tissue categories.

Homology

Paralogs
PROSER1 has no paralogs.

Orthologs
PROSER1 is highly conserved among mammals. It is less highly conserved, though has been found, in fish, birds, and some invertebrates. It is not expressed in bacteria, plants, or fungi. Show below is table of orthologs compiled from NCBI.

Protein

General properties
The translated PROSER1 protein is 944 amino acids long. Its predicted molecular weight is 95.7 kdal. PROSER1 has an isoelectric point of 9. It is predicted to be localized to the nucleus.

Composition
The sequence is rich in proline and serine and not particularly low in any other amino acids.

Domains
PROSER1 contains one domain of unknown function, DUF 4476, part of pfam14771. The DUF spans from amino acids 26 to 121.
The molecular weight of DUF 4476 is 11.1 kdal.

Secondary structure
PROSER1 is composed primarily of alpha helices, beta sheets, and coils. The protein is largely coiled. The DUF is composed mainly of alpha helices and coils. It has slightly fewer beta sheets compared to the protein as a whole.

References